Proletariat may refer to:

Working Class
Proletariat, the working class

Marxism
Dictatorship of the proletariat, a Marxist political term
Lumpenproletariat, a term from Karl Marx and Friedrich Engel's work, The German Ideology

Music
The Proletariat, an American punk rock band
Proletaryat (in Polish), a rock band from Poland

Political parties
Proletariat (party) - First Proletariat, the first Polish socialist party; its successor, the Second Proletariat; and another Polish party, the Third Proletariat.
Communist Party of the Portuguese Workers / Reorganizative Movement of the Party of the Proletariat, a Maoist communist party in Portugal
Revolutionary Party of the Proletariat - Bases for Revolution, a political party in Portugal
Revolutionary Party of the Proletariat - Revolutionary Brigades, a political party in Portugal
Party of the Dictatorship of the Proletariat, a communist party in Russia

Other
Proletariat, developer of the game Spellbreak